Prochorus the Iberian (c. 985–1066) – was a Georgian monk and founder of the Monastery of the Cross in Jerusalem. According to the Georgian Vita of Prochorus, he was born in the Kingdom of the Iberians under the name of George of Shavsheti and was raised in the local monastery, where he became a monk, and later a priest. Around 1010–1015, aged 30, Prochorus would leave for the Holy Land. He would stay for number of years in the Lavra of Saint Sabas. Prochorus later would move to Jerusalem in an attempt to gather his Georgian compatriots who were scattered throughout the Palestinian monasteries. Per Vita, Prochorus would construct the monastery in 1064 by the order of the King Bagrat IV of Georgia and his donations brought to the Holy Land by George the Hagiorite.

Prochorus died in 1066. He is venerated as a saint and his feast day in the Eastern Orthodox Church is February 12.

References

Bibliography
 Charkiewicz, Jarosław (2005) Gruzińscy święci, Warszawa: Warszawska Metropolia Prawosławna,
 Salia, Kalistrat (1983) History of the Georgian Nation, Académie Française, Paris
 Tchekhanovets, Yana (2018) The Caucasian Archaeology of the Holy Land, Armenian, Georgian and Albanian Communities Between the Fourth and Eleventh Centuries CE, Brill Publishers, 
985 births
1066 deaths
Saints of Georgia (country)
Eastern Orthodox saints
Christian monks from Georgia (country)
11th-century Christian saints
11th-century people from Georgia (country)
Founders of Christian monasteries